The Canadian Bandurist Capella is a vocal-instrumental ensemble that combines the sounds of male choral singing with the orchestral accompaniment of the multi-stringed Ukrainian bandura. Originally established as "Toronto Bandurist Capella" in 2001, the ensemble has been performing under the name "Canadian Bandurist Capella" since 2004. It is based in Toronto, Ontario, Canada.

History
The ensemble was founded in 2001 as a male bandurist chorus under the name "Toronto Bandurist Capella". The original group was under the artistic direction of Victor Mishalow and included several instrumentalists from the Hryhory Kytasty Bandura Chorus, as well as choristers from various Ukrainian choirs in Toronto. The ensemble premiered at the Canadian National Exhibition on August 23, 2001, with 24 performers.The group incorporated in 2003. In 2004 the ensemble officially changed its name to "Canadian Bandurist Capella" and released its first self-titled CD in June 2004.

During the first years the group performed in various cities across Ontario. The Capella's first concert outside of Ontario was in Montreal on March 27, 2004.

On May 21, 2006 the ensemble performed in Chicago, marking its first international performance.  Later that year the Capella made its first visit to the Canadian Prairies by performing in Winnipeg, and in Dauphin, Manitoba at Canada's National Ukrainian Festival.

The group released its second CD titled "Грай Кобзарю!" (Play Kobzar!) with renown guest soloist Pavlo Hunka in the spring of 2008.

In 2009 the ensemble embraced a 'narrative performance style' that included musical numbers interspersed with stories and poems. This included programs such as "Слово Тараса" ("Word of Taras"), "Козацька Слава" ("Kozak Glory") and "Слава Героям УПА" ("Glory to Our Heroes UPA").

In 2013 Andriy Dmytrovych was appointed Artistic Director of the Capella. Under his direction, the group released its third CD (First Live Recording) "In Memory of Those Who Lost Their Lives on the Maidan".

Audio Recordings
1. "Canadian Bandurist Capella" (2004) 14 tracks

2. "Гpaй Кoбзapю!" (Play Kobzar!) (2008) 12 tracks

3. "In Memory of Those Who Lost Their Lives on the Maidan" (2014) 12 tracks

4. "Козацькому роду нема переводу" (Kozaks Forever) (2017) 12 tracks

5. "Коляда" (Koliada) (2017) 13 tracks

Artistic Leadership
 Victor Mishalow (2001-2013) - Artistic Director
 Yurij Petlura (2013) - Conductor (Temporary. Other positions include: Concertmaster (2001-2013), Assistant conductor (2013-2014).)
 Andriy Dmytrovych (2013–2017) - Artistic Director (Other positions include: Choirmaster and co-conductor (2004-2011).)
 Pavlo Fondera (2017-2018) - Guest Conductor (Other positions include: Choirmaster (2017–Present).)
 Julian Kytasty (2018–Present) - Musical Director 
 Vasyl Turyanyn (2018–Present) - Conductor

Current direction
The current Musical Director of the ensemble is Julian Kytasty. The artistic team is composed of conductor - Vasyl Turyanyn, choirmaster - Pavlo Fondera, and concertmaster - Borys Ostapienko.

Chronology
2001 - Established as the "Toronto Bandurist Capella", under the artistic direction of Victor Mishalow
2001 - First performance on August 23, 2001 at the Canadian National Exhibition.
2001 - Elected the first board of directors in autumn of 2001.
2002 - First independent Christmas Concert in Oshawa, Ontario.
2003 - Incorporated under the name "Toronto Bandurist Capella" on May 27, 2003.
2004 - Changed its trade name to "Canadian Bandurist Capella".
2004 - Released its first CD, self-titled "Canadian Bandurist Capella" in June 2004.
2006 - First international concert in Chicago, Illinois, USA.
2008 - Released its second CD titled "Гpaй Кoбзapю!" ("Play Kobzar!") featuring renown baritone/bass Pavlo Hunka in April 2008.
2009 - "Word of Taras" (Слово Тараса) concert tour (St.Catharines, Oshawa, Toronto).
2010 - In July 2010, helped re-establish the bandura program of the ODUM Music and Sports camp in London, Ontario.
2011 - Performed at the Shevchenko Monument unveiling in Ottawa, Ontario on June 26, 2011.
2012 - Glory to our Heroes (UPA) concerts (Toronto, Oshawa).
2013 - Yurij Petlura assumes the role of temporary Artistic Director in May 2013.
2013 - Andriy Dmytrovych appointed as Artistic Director in autumn 2013.
2014 - Performed at the "Gala Concert commemorating the 200th Anniversary of the birth of Taras Shevchenko" at Koerner Hall, Toronto, Ontario.
2014 - Performed at the "Canada and Ukraine Together" Benefit Concert at Hammerson Hall, Living Arts Centre, Mississauga, Ontario.
2015 - Released its third CD (First Live performance CD) "In Memory of Those Who Lost Their Lives on the Maidan" in January 2015".
2017 - Joint Christmas Concert together with the Ukrainian Bandurist Chorus titled - "Kobzar Christmas" on January 22, 2017.
2017 - Released its fourth CD (3rd Studio Recording) titled "Козацькому роду нема переводу" (Kozaks Forever) in September 2017.

Sources
Мішалов, В. "Кобзарська спадщина Гната Хоткевича у діаспорі" // Традиції і сучасне в українській культурі /Тези доповідей Міжнародної науково-практичної конференції, присвяченої 125-річчю Гната Хоткевича/ X.: 2002. - С.97-98
Мішалов, В. – Бандура в еміграційних центрах у міжвоєнний період (с.95-103) – Karpacki Collage Artystyczny – Biuletyn – Przemysl, 2005

References

External links

Official Website
Youtube channel

Ukrainian music
Kobzarstvo
Musical groups from Toronto
Ukrainian-Canadian culture
Bandura ensembles
Canadian choirs
Musical groups established in 2001
2001 establishments in Ontario